The AN/FLR-9 is a type of very large circular "Wullenweber" antenna array, built at eight locations during the cold war for HF/DF direction finding of high priority targets. The worldwide network, known collectively as "Iron Horse", could locate HF communications almost anywhere on Earth. Because of the exceptionally large size of its outer reflecting screen (1056 vertical steel wires supported by 96  towers), the FLR-9 was commonly referred to by the nickname "Elephant Cage." Constructed in the early to mid 1960s, in May 2016 the last operational FLR-9 at Joint Base Elmendorf-Richardson in Alaska was decommissioned. It can be confused with the US Navy's AN/FRD-10, which also used a Wullenweber antenna.

Description 

The AN/FLR-9 Operation and Service Manual describes the array as follows:

The antenna array is composed of three concentric rings of antenna elements. Each ring of elements receives RF signals for an assigned portion of the 1.5 to 30-MHz radio spectrum. The outer ring normally covers the 2 to 6-MHz range (band A), but also provides reduced coverage down to 1.5 MHz. The center ring covers the 6 to 18-MHz range (band B) and the inner ring covers the 18 to 30-MHz range (band C). Band B contains 96 sleeve monopole elements spaced 37.5 feet (11.43 m) apart (3.75 degrees). Band C contains 48 antenna elements mounted on wooden structures placed in a circle around the central building. Bands A and B elements are vertically polarized. Band C elements consist of two horizontally polarized dipole antenna subelements electrically tied together, and positioned one above the other.

The array is centered on a ground screen 1,443 feet (439.8 m) in diameter. The arrangement permits accurate direction finding of signals from up to 4000 nautical miles (7408 km) away.

FLR-9s were constructed at the following places:  
 USASA Field Station Augsburg (Gablingen Kaserne), Germany
 Chicksands, England
 Clark AB, Philippines
 Joint Base Elmendorf-Richardson, Alaska, USA (formerly designated as Elmendorf AFB)
 Karamursel, Turkey
 7th Radio Research Field Station/Ramasun Station, Udon Thani Province, Thailand
 Misawa AB, Japan, built 1963 to 1965, demolished beginning in 2014.
 San Vito dei Normanni Air Station, Italy (near Brindisi, Italy)

Advances in technology have made the FLR-9 obsolete. In 1997, the FLR-9 at the former Clark AB in the Philippines was converted into a 35,000-seat fabric-covered amphitheatre. In early May 2002, systematic dismantling of the FLR-9 at San Vito began, and it was totally deconstructed by the end of that month.  Although the markings of where the array stood remain in the ground, the structure is completely gone.

Demolition of the FLR-9 at Misawa began in October 2014.

A decommissioning ceremony for the last active FLR-9, at Joint Base Elmendorf-Richardson, was held on May 25, 2016.

See also 
 Signals intelligence
 High-frequency direction finding

References

External links 
 AN/FLR-9 Operation and Service manual
 USASA Field Station Augsburg – history of the Augsburg site
 Extreme close-up hi-res aerial photo of FLR-9 at Chicksands just before being dismantled in 1996
 FLR-9 at Ramasun Station, Udon Thani, Thailand 
 FLR-9 at Elmendorf AFB, Alaska 
 FLR-9 at Gablingen, Augsburg, Germany 
 FLR-9 at Misawa, Honshū Island, Japan 
 FLR-9 site at Chicksands, Bedfordshire, UK 
 FLR-9 site at Clark AFB, Philippines 
 FLR-9 site at Karamursel AS, Turkey 
 FLR-9 site at San Vito dei Normanni AS, Italy 
 AN/FLR-9 information on FAS.org
 FLR-9 photo collection on FTVA.org

Automatic identification and data capture
Military radio systems of the United States
Radio frequency antenna types
Radio-frequency identification
Surveillance
Military electronics of the United States
Antennas (radio)